This was the first edition of the event.

Ryan Harrison won the title, defeating Marcos Baghdatis 7–6(10–8), 6–4 in the final.

Seeds

Draw

Finals

Top half

Bottom half

References
 Main Draw
 Qualifying Draw

City of Onkaparinga ATP Challenger - Singles
2015 Singles
2015 in Australian tennis